Hugo Bernhard Kikson (18 July 1898 Halina Parish, Pärnu County – ?) was an Estonian politician. He was a member of Estonian Constituent Assembly.

References

1898 births
Members of the Estonian Constituent Assembly
Year of death missing